Phaeoxantha testudinea is a species of tiger beetle in the subfamily Cicindelinae that was described by Klug in 1834.

References

Beetles described in 1834
Beetles of South America